Pterostylis microglossa, commonly known as the Kalbarri shell orchid, is a species of orchid endemic to the south-west of Western Australia. Non-flowering plants have a rosette of leaves flat on the ground but flowering plants lack a rosette and have a flowering stem with leaves and a single green, white and brownish-red flower.

Description
Pterostylis microglossa is a terrestrial, perennial, deciduous, herb with an underground tuber. Non-flowering plants have a rosette of more or less round leaves and sometimes the plants form colonies so that the rosette leaves cover an area of several square metres. The dorsal sepal and petals are fused, forming a hood or "galea" over the column, the dorsal sepal with a short point. The labellum is short but just visible above the sinus between the lateral sepals. Flowering occurs in June and July.

Taxonomy and naming
Pterostylis microglossa was first formally described in 2012 by David Jones and Christopher French from a specimen collected near Kalbarri National Park and the description was published in Australian Orchid Review. The species had previously been known as Pterostylis sp. 'Kalbarri'. The specific epithet (microglossa) is derived from the Ancient Greek words mikros meaning "small" or "little" and glossa meaning "tongue" referring to the relatively short labellum.

Distribution and habitat
The Kalbarri shell orchid grows in shallow soil on granite outcrops and on consolidated sand dunes between Shark Bay and the Moore River in the Geraldton Sandplains and Swan Coastal Plain biogeographic regions.

Conservation
Pterostylis microglossa is listed as "not threatened" by the Government of Western Australia Department of Parks and Wildlife.

References

microglossa
Endemic orchids of Australia
Orchids of Western Australia
Plants described in 2012